Oliver Spencer (April 17, 1931 – April 28, 1991) was an American National Football League (NFL) tackle and assistant coach. He played eight seasons in the NFL, with the Detroit Lions (1953 and 1956), the Green Bay Packers (1957 and 1958), the Detroit Lions again (1959, 1960 and 1961), and the Oakland Raiders (1963). Later. he was an assistant coach for the Raiders for seventeen seasons.

Spencer died on April 28, 1991, of a heart attack.

See also
Other American Football League players

External links
 Profile on Pro Football Reference
 Ollie Spencer, Football Player, 60 (Obituary)

References 

1931 births
1991 deaths
Kansas Jayhawks football players
Detroit Lions players
Green Bay Packers players
Oakland Raiders players
Players of American football from Kansas
American football offensive tackles
Oakland Raiders coaches
People from Pratt County, Kansas
American Football League players